The Stuttgart Vulgate or Weber-Gryson Vulgate (full title: Biblia Sacra iuxta vulgatam versionem) is a manual critical edition of the Vulgate first published in 1969.

The most recent edition of the work is the fifth edition, from 2007.

History 
Based on the edition of Oxford and the edition of Rome of the Vulgate, but with independent examination of manuscript evidence, the Württembergische Bibelanstalt, later the Deutsche Bibelgesellschaft (German Bible Society), based in Stuttgart, first published a critical edition of the complete Vulgate in 1969. The work has since continued to be updated, with a fifth edition appearing in 2007. The project was originally directed by Robert Weber, OSB (a monk of the same Benedictine abbey responsible for the Rome edition), with collaborators Bonifatius Fischer, Jean Gribomont, Hedley Frederick Davis Sparks (also responsible for the completion of the Oxford edition), and Walter Thiele. Roger Gryson has been responsible for the most recent editions. It is thus marketed by its publisher as the "Weber-Gryson" edition, but is also frequently referred to as the Stuttgart edition.

Characteristics 
The Stuttgart Vulgate is a manual edition. The Stuttgart Vulgate is based on the Oxford Vulgate and the Benedictine Vulgate.
The Weber-Gryson edition includes Jerome's prologues and the Eusebian Canons. It does not, however, provide any of the other prefatory material often found in medieval Bible manuscripts, such as chapter headings, some of which are included in the large editions of Oxford and Rome.

In its spelling, it retains medieval Latin orthography, sometimes using oe rather than ae, and having more proper nouns beginning with H (e.g., Helimelech instead of Elimelech). It also uses line breaks, rather than the modern system of punctuation marks, to indicate the structure of each verse, following the practice of the Oxford and Rome editions.

It contains two Latin Psalters, both the traditional Gallicanum and the juxta Hebraicum, which are printed on facing pages to allow easy comparison and contrast between the two versions. It has an expanded Apocrypha, containing Psalm 151 and the Epistle to the Laodiceans in addition to 3 and 4 Esdras and the Prayer of Manasseh. In addition, its modern prefaces (in Latin, German, French, and English) are a source of information about the history of the Vulgate.

Sigla 

The following sigla are used in the Stuttgart Vulgate to designate previous editions of texts of the Vulgate:

<div style="float:left; width:100%;clear: left;">

Miscellaneous 
This edition's early popularity can in part be attributed to a 1977 concordance based on the second edition of the book by Bonifatius Fischer (Novae concordantiae Biblorum Sacrorum iuxta vulgatam versionem critice editam), which was a key reference tool before the availability of personal computers.

A translation of the text of the Stuttgart Vulgate into German was completed in 2018.

See also 

 Oxford Vulgate
 Benedictine Vulgate
 Biblia Hebraica (Kittel)
 Novum Testamentum Graece

References

Further reading

External links 
Stuttgart Vulgate (main biblical text only), on the official website of the Deutsche Bibelgesellschaft

Editions of the Vulgate
1969 books